The 1957 Maine Black Bears football team was an American football team that represented the University of Maine as a member of the Yankee Conference during the 1957 college football season. In its seventh season under head coach Harold Westerman, the team compiled a 4–3 record (2–2 against conference opponents) and finished third out of the six teams in the Yankee Conference. The team played its home games at Alumni Field in Orono, Maine. Vernon Moulton was the team captain.

Schedule

References

Maine
Maine Black Bears football seasons
Maine Black Bears football